Mermaiding (also referred to as artistic mermaiding, mermaidry, or artistic mermaid performance) is the practice of wearing, and often swimming in, a costume mermaid tail.

In the beginning of the twentieth century mermaiding was sometimes referred to as water ballet, but it is not currently a term that is commonly used. Mermaiding should not be confused with modern synchronized swimming, although there can be some overlap if a mermaid performance troupe is performing a synchronized routine.

It is difficult to determine exactly where the term "mermaiding" was coined; but some of the first professional freelance mermaids appeared on the world scene around 2004, such as Hannah Mermaid, Mahina Mermaid, and Mermaid Linden, who were all playing with the term. A little later on, the term was brought to a wider use and community by Iona the Mermaid, co-founder of MerNetwork.com. Newer professional mermaids like Mermaid Elle have made mermaiding more popular and mainstream by performing at celebrity events and featured on TV, music videos and magazines.

Mermaiding is both a profession and a hobby. Professional mermaids will often swim in live, filmed, or photographed productions or shows and can be hired for special events. Nonprofessional enthusiasts swim in tails at their local pools if the pool allows it, lakes, rivers, and seashores, or take part in mermaid-themed photo shoots, birthday parties, or mermaid meetings with other Mers. Mermaiding is popular with all ages and genders. Mermaiding practitioners are sometimes called mermaids, professional mermaids, or occasionally, water ballerinas. Within the community, mermaid or merfolk can be shortened to "mer." Mermaiding is often seen as a form of extreme cosplay due to the nature of crafting the tails and other prosthetics used by practitioners. There are several tail-making companies supplying the community with everything from fabric tails to full SFX prostheses costing thousands of dollars.

History

Annette Kellerman
Annette Marie Sarah Kellerman (6 July 1886 – 6 November 1975) was an Australian professional swimmer, vaudeville star, film actress and writer. She was one of the first women to wear a one-piece bathing costume, instead of the then-accepted pantaloons, and inspired others to follow her example. In 1902, Kellerman decided to take her swimming seriously and subsequently won the ladies' 100 yards and mile championships of New South Wales in the record times of 1 minute, 22 seconds and 33 minutes, 49 seconds respectively. In that same year, her parents decided to move to Melbourne, and she was enrolled at Mentone Girls' Grammar School where her mother had accepted a music teaching position. During her time at school, Kellerman gave exhibitions of swimming and diving at the main Melbourne baths, performed a mermaid act at Princes Court entertainment centre and did two shows a day swimming with fish in a glass tank at the Exhibition Aquarium.

In June–July 1903 Kellermann performed sensational high dives in the Coogee scene of Bland Holt's spectacular, The Breaking of the Drought, at the Melbourne Theatre Royal. She is often credited with inventing the sport of synchronized swimming after her 1907 performance of the first water ballet in a glass tank at the New York Hippodrome. She has a star on the Hollywood Walk of Fame. The majority of Kellerman's films had themes of aquatic adventure. She performed her own stunts including diving from ninety-two feet into the sea and sixty feet into a pool of crocodiles. Many times she would play mermaids named Annette or variations of her own name. Her "fairy tale films", as she called them, started with The Mermaid (1911), in which she was the first actress to wear a swimmable mermaid costume on film. She designed her own mermaid swimming costumes and sometimes made them herself. Similar designs are still used by The Weeki Wachee Springs Mermaids, including her aquatic fairy costume first introduced in Queen of the Sea (1918).

Esther Williams
Esther Jane Williams (8 August 1921 – 6 June 2013) was an American competitive swimmer and actress. Williams set multiple national and regional swimming records in her late teens as part of the Los Angeles Athletic Club swim team. Unable to compete in the 1940 Summer Olympics because of the outbreak of World War II, she joined Billy Rose's Aquacade, where she took on the role vacated by Eleanor Holm after the show's move from New York City to San Francisco. While in the city, she spent five months swimming alongside Olympic gold medal winner and Tarzan star, Johnny Weissmuller. Williams caught the attention of MGM scouts at the Aquacade. After appearing in several small roles, alongside Mickey Rooney in an Andy Hardy film, and future five-time co-star Van Johnson in A Guy Named Joe, Williams made a series of films in the 1940s and early 1950s known as "aquamusicals", which featured elaborate performances with synchronized swimming and diving. In 1952, Williams appeared in her only biographical role, as Australian swimming star Annette Kellerman in Million Dollar Mermaid, which went on to become her nickname while at MGM. Williams left MGM in 1956 and appeared in a handful of unsuccessful feature films, followed by several extremely popular water-themed television specials, including one from Cypress Gardens, Florida.

Many of her MGM films, such as Million Dollar Mermaid and Jupiter's Darling, contained elaborately staged synchronized swimming scenes, with considerable risk to Williams. She broke her neck filming a 115 ft dive off a tower during a climactic musical number for the film Million Dollar Mermaid and was in a body cast for seven months. She subsequently recovered, although she continued to suffer headaches as a result of the accident. Her many hours spent submerged in a studio tank resulted in ruptured eardrums numerous times. She also nearly drowned after not being able to find the trap door in the ceiling of a tank. The walls and ceiling were painted black and the trap door blended in. Williams was pulled out only because a member of the crew realized the door was not opening.

Weeki Wachee Mermaids
Located an hour north of Tampa on Florida's Gulf Coast, Weeki Wachee Springs has hosted a mermaid show since 1947. Swimmers, trained by Newton Perry, performed synchronised ballet in the natural springs at the site. The resort was purchased and promoted by the American Broadcasting Co. (ABC) in 1959.

In 2008, Weeki Wachee Springs was incorporated into the State of Florida Park system.

Film

Miranda is a 1948 British comedy film, directed by Ken Annakin and written by Peter Blackmore, who also wrote the play of the same name from which the film was adapted. Denis Waldock provided additional dialogue. A light comedy, the film is about a beautiful and playful mermaid played by Glynis Johns and her effect on Griffith Jones. Googie Withers and Margaret Rutherford are also featured in the film. Glynis Johns and Margaret Rutherford reprised their roles in the 1954 sequel, Mad About Men. Miranda is the story of a fisherman who brings home a mermaid disguised as an invalid in a wheelchair. Her flirting causes some chaos and eventually she returns to the sea.

Mr. Peabody and the Mermaid is a 1948 fantasy film starring William Powell and Ann Blyth in the title roles. Irene Hervey played Mr. Peabody's wife. The film was based on the 1945 novel Peabody's Mermaid by Guy and Constance Jones. Sequences were shot at the Weeki Wachee Springs in Florida. Arthur Peabody, while in the midst of a mid-life crisis, captures a mermaid while on vacation with his wife. After hiding her in the resort's fish pond, hijinks ensue.

Million Dollar Mermaid (also known as The One Piece Bathing Suit in the UK) is a 1952 Metro-Goldwyn-Mayer biographical musical film of the life of Australian swimming star Annette Kellerman, played by Esther Williams. It was directed by Mervyn LeRoy and produced by Arthur Hornblow Jr. from a screenplay by Everett Freeman. The music score was by Adolph Deutsch, the cinematography by George J. Folsey and the choreography by Busby Berkeley. "Million Dollar Mermaid" not only became Esther Williams' nickname around Hollywood, but it became the title of her autobiography (New York: Simon & Schuster, 1999), co-written with Digby Diehl. Williams has often called this her favorite film.

Cinema and television post-1980

For simplicity's sake, this section focuses on film and shows with live-action swimmers and tails as the main characters. For an exhaustive list of mermaids in media, please see Mermaids in popular culture.

Cinema

Splash (1984): starring Daryl Hannah and Tom Hanks, Hannah played a mermaid who falls in love with a human. She could walk on dry land in human form, but her legs changed into a fish tail whenever she got wet. Much of the movie revolves around her humorous attempts to conceal her true identity from her lover. A made-for-television sequel, Splash, Too, followed in 1988, starring Amy Yasbeck and Todd Waring. Immensely popular, the film precipitated a surge in popularity of mermaids in general and mermaiding in particular, as it inspired many people to buy tails and get into the water.

Daryl Hannah's mermaid tail was designed and created by Academy Award-winning visual effects artist Robert Short. The tail was fully functional. Hannah swam with the mermaid tail so fast that her safety team could not keep pace with her. According to the DVD documentary, Hannah had been swimming "mermaid" style with her legs bound together since she was a child, due to her fascination with Hans Christian Andersen's "The Little Mermaid" story. However, by the standards of swimmable mermaid tails, the exceptionally detailed film tail was difficult to remove. For the sake of efficiency, Hannah at first kept it on while the cast had lunch. In the documentary contained on the 20th-anniversary Splash! DVD, Tom Hanks recalled how the other cast members would drop French fries over the side of the tank to her as though she were a trained sea mammal, for she couldn't leave the water while her legs were "shrink-wrapped."

Mermaid Got Married (1994): this Hong Kong romantic-comedy tells the story of a school teacher who falls in love with a mermaid who'd rescued him as a young boy. The film stars Asian cinema idols Ekin Cheng, Christy Chung, and Takeshi Kaneshiro. The film is loosely based on Splash.

The Thirteenth Year (1999): a teen learns that his birth mother is a mermaid after he begins to grow fins and slimy scales on his thirteenth birthday.

Mermaids (2003): this 2003 television film was directed by Ian Barry and stars Serah D'Laine, Nikita Ager and Australian model Erika Heynatz as a trio of mermaid sisters who band together to avenge their father's death. The film is also known in other languages as Sereias (Brazil), Três Sereias (Portugal), Mermaids – Las sirenas (Spain), Oi treis gorgones (Greece), Seireenisiskokset (Finland), Sirènes (France), and Sirenas (Argentina). Some of the tails used in the production have been sold to professional mermaids.

Aquamarine (2006): the title character is a mermaid (Sara Paxton) who is washed ashore after a violent storm. She decides to search for true love on land, and makes two good friends (Joanna "JoJo" Levesque and Emma Roberts) along the way. The film, loosely based on a children's book of the same name by Alice Hoffman, and directed by American director Elizabeth Allen, was filmed in Queensland, Australia. There were three different tails used in the production, including an animatronic model that was operated remotely. At least one of the others was a fully swimmable tail worn by the actress.

Pirates of the Caribbean: On Stranger Tides (2011): during his search for the Fountain of Youth, Jack Sparrow encounters several mermaids. This film is included in this list because, like Splash, it accounted for an increase in mermaid popularity upon its release, and includes a central mermaid character. However, no actual tails were used during filming; they were added during the editing process with CGI. On Stranger Tides employed 1,112 shots of computer-generated imagery, which were done by ten visual effects companies. Cinesite visual effects supervisor Simon Stanley-Clamp claimed that the most difficult part was doing the effects in 3D: "Rotoscoping is tricky. Cleaning up plates is double the work, and tracking has to be spot on." The lead companies, with over 300 effects each, were Industrial Light & Magic—responsible for, among others, the mermaids and most water effects—and Moving Picture Company, who created digital ships and environment extensions, such as changing weather and designing cliffs and waterfalls. Filming the mermaids involved eight model-actresses, who portrayed them outside the water, as well as 22 synchronized swimming athletes and a group of stuntwomen, both of whom wore motion capture suits to be later replaced by digital mermaids. Mermaid corpses were depicted by plaster models. The design tried to avoid the traditional representations of mermaids in paintings and literature, instead going for a scaly body with a translucent membrane inspired by both jellyfish and the fabric employed in ballet tutus. To make the mermaids more menacing underwater, the faces of the actresses had some digital touch-ups on the underwater scenes, adding sharper teeth and a shimmery fish scale quality on the skin.

H2O: Just Add Water (2006): this TV series involves three teenage girls who, after encountering a mysterious island grotto, transform into mermaids whenever water touches any part of their bodies. A spin-off series, Mako: Island of Secrets, was released on 26 July 2013. Three different types of mermaid tails are used on the show: custom-fitted tails that the girls swim in, a "floppy tail" used for stationary shots, and a "hard tail" for stunts. The custom costumes took six months to build, with the tails and tops made from body casts and comprising individually hand-crafted scales. Inside the tail are leg straps where the girls are strapped up and then zipped up. Once in costume, the girls have to be lifted into the water. Attempts were made to minimise the on-screen visibility of the zips on the tails, such as adding extra scales and crafting a ridge of material around the length of the zip. The tail fin itself was designed with a foot pedal to assist the actresses with swimming.

Dyesebel is a mermaid character based on graphic novelist Mars Ravelo's creation in GMA Network in the Philippines. The story was adapted into five films and a spin-off between 1953 and 1996.

Modern use

With the 1984 motion picture Splash, mermaiding caught the popular culture wave. Splash tailmaker Thom Shouse's website offered tails for a fee, but also inspired a do it yourself movement. (The Splash Mermaid was designed and created by the Academy Award-winning visual effects artist Robert Short. Shouse was the project foreman on Short's mermaid crew.) The early 2000s saw many performers and artists of varying ages, genders, body shapes, and ethnicities uploading videos and photographs of tails and underwater performances to YouTube and personal websites.

Professional Mermaids
Mermaid Linden, Hannah Mermaid,  (aka Mermaid Grace), Katrin Gray (aka Mermaid Kat) and Elle Jimenez (aka Mermaid Elle) are four of the most successful mermaid performers in the world. Today, many mermaid performers work at aquariums, casinos, or tourist attractions professionally. Some freedivers wear mermaid tails to add novelty to the water sport.

Although the vast majority of mers swim in their tails, a small handful of members of the mermaiding subculture do not actually swim. These mers might wear tails to raise awareness for ocean conservation issues, dry land cosplay, or as character performers at children's parties. This does not preclude them from being active in the wider community.

In many countries people can now join mermaid swimming classes, where they learn how to swim in mermaid tails. The Mermaid Kat Academy was the world's first mermaid school that made mermaiding accessible to everyone and opened in August 2012. Shortly after that the Philippine Mermaid Swimming Academy and several other mermaid schools opened around the world.

Equipment
The basic structure of the tail is that of a sleeve or tube that encompasses the legs from ankle to waist, enclosing fins or a monofin that is strapped to and extends from the wearer's feet. The stiff fin provides structure for the fluke as well as propulsion during swimming.

Materials
Tails can be made out of almost any material, from fabric to platinum cure silicone, and are priced accordingly, from $100 to several thousand dollars. Several tailmaking companies are currently operating, in addition to a vibrant "do it yourself" scene. Secondhand tails are frequently sold privately or through sites such as eBay.

Fabric: Due to their great elasticity and strength, lycra and spandex are the first choice in material for fabric tails. Fabric tails are recommended for beginners and children, as they are relatively inexpensive, easy to clean, and allow for growth. They hug the body closely without being too restrictive. Fabric tails come in a wide range of colors and patterns, and can be customized with paint. Other fabrics are often added to the tails in strategic locations for added flair; for instance, chiffon (fabric) is sometimes sewn onto the ends of flukes to give a greater impression of flow, or onto the hip area as decorative pectoral fins.
Neoprene: Neoprene or polychloroprene are synthetic rubbers produced by the polymerization of chloroprene. Neoprene exhibits good chemical stability, and maintains flexibility over a wide temperature range. It is used in a wide variety of applications, such as laptop sleeves, orthopedic braces, electrical insulation, liquid and sheet applied elastomeric membranes or flashings, and wetsuits. It is a popular material for tails due in part to its thickness, which creates a smooth line, rendering the tail more lifelike; it is also waterproof and fairly durable. Like fabric, neoprene can be painted and customized. It is often used as the base for sequin tails due to its strength.
Sequin tails: In this variation on fabric and neoprene tails, individual sequins are sewn onto a tail for decoration. Occasionally, sequins are sewn onto only a few areas to serve as a highlight; more commonly, they are sewn over the entire tail, and provide all of the tail's color and patterning. Sequin tails are time-intensive to create, as each sequin must be sewn on by hand, and as a result these tails can be quite expensive. Variation is nearly unlimited due to the amounts and types of sequins available on the market.
Latex tails: Molded latex is sometimes used as a tail material. It can be molded into scale shapes, and gives a more lifelike impression than fabric, particularly when poured or otherwise affixed onto a neoprene backing. Some of the earliest tails available on the market were made of the same type of latex used in latex clothing, however, these tails went out of production when the company owner died. The material has very little elasticity, which renders the tail difficult to get on and off. Many mermaids cannot use latex due to allergies, and mermaids who specialize in children's parties or other events where a tail may be touched often stay away from this material for that same reason.
During the later part of the 2000s and up through about 2012–2013, partial tin-cure latex or tin-cure silicone spread over a neoprene or neoprin base became popular, due to the increased realism of the tails and the relatively low cost of materials (tin-cure tails generally retail around US$300–600). This proved problematic, however, as tin-cure silicones and latexes are not skin-safe materials. Effects over overexposure include "skin, respiratory, kidney and liver damage. Repeated or prolonged contact with the preparation may cause removal of natural fat from the skin resulting in non-allergic contact dermatitis and absorption through the skin. Prolonged and repeated skin contact may cause irritation and possibly dermatitis. Prolonged, repeated, or high exposures may cause weakness and depression of the central nervous system." Some of these ailments have been recorded by mermaids who have tails containing tin-cure materials, although this evidence is anecdotal. Tin-cure tails also degrade with prolonged exposure to water; the silicone becomes soft and white while peeling away from the neoprene on which it rests. It is currently advised that those who are considering making or purchasing tin-cure tails do so with extreme caution and at their own risk. Tin-cure tails have historically not been allowed in aquariums featuring live fish or other sea life, due to the chemicals leaching from the tail into the water and causing potential harm to the aquarium's ecosystem.

Silicone tails: Currently, silicone rubber tails (also known as platinum-cure silicone tails and Dragonskin silicone tails, after a silicone brand name) are the most popular and most expensive tails on the market. In addition to being relatively lifelike and durable, silicone tails are skin-safe and inert in most environments once cured. Neutral buoyancy in the water allows for ease of sinking and natural-looking swimming, although they are quite heavy (25–60 lbs) out of the water. Colors and patterns are only limited by the designer's imagination, and if produced properly, paint or pigment does not chip off the tail. The material has excellent elasticity, allowing relative ease in getting in and out of the tail, and fitting snugly once on. Silicone is slip-resistant and grips the skin, which results in less tail slip or gapping during vigorous swimming. It is rare to find silicone tails for less than US$1000, even used, and their prices increase with the amount of extra detail, color, and number of fins added. Silicone tails can costs many thousands of dollars. Due to the expense and heavier weight involved, platinum-cure silicone tails are not recommended for beginners.
Urethane tails: Urethane, a type of synthetic rubber, is a relatively durable material, and with proper care can last for years without need of repair. Currently, the only tailmaker working in urethane is Thom Shouse, owner of Mermaid Rentals and member of the original SFX team that created the tail for Splash. It is thought that he uses a urethane-latex mix, although he has never released his formula to the public.
Blankets: Over the past several years mermaid tail blankets have become popular. General they are made of specially woven and shaped knitted fabrics, but can also be found in polyester fleece fabrics. They are generally open at the back so that when tucked around the legs they give the illusion that the wearer has a tail. They are not meant to get wet and are not really used for character parties or cosplay. Patterns are available so that knitters and crafters can make their own.

Monofins
A monofin is a type of swimfin typically used in underwater sports such as finswimming, free-diving and underwater orienteering, in recreational freediving, and even sometimes just for fun. It consists of a single surface attached to footpockets for both of the diver's feet. They have become popular with the mermaiding community due to excellent propulsion during swimming and their realistically mermaidish silhouette. Monofins can be made of glass fiber or carbon fiber. The swimmer's muscle power, swimming style, and the type of aquatic activity the monofin is used for determines the choice of size, stiffness, and materials.

Monofins are carefully chosen when a tail is commissioned, taking into account the swimmer's ability, location of use, and desired look in the water. For instance, a large, stiff fiberglass monofin will serve a mermaid well in strong ocean currents, giving them speed and strength in the water. A mermaid who will be performing in a glass tank may choose a smaller, more flexible, plastic model, which imparts agility and graceful flow rather than strong propulsion. Some mermaids prefer to sand, cut, or otherwise alter their monofins into a preferred shape to suit their individual purposes; others prefer to create their monofins from scratch rather than purchase or alter an already existing model.

For safety reasons, it is recommended that beginners not create their own monofins from scratch. Some materials that have been used in monofins, such as acrylic or plexiglas, have shattered under hydraulic stress and have caused severe injury and could result in drowning. Plastic polycarbonate is also not recommended, as it will crack and snap under pressure, rendering the monofin useless and dangerous.

Humanitarian appeal
A common practice among professional mermaids is environmental and individualist advocacy. Many mermaids speak out, create internet campaigns, and work with major environmental or self-help organizations. Susan Rockefeller's 2012 short-form documentary Mission of Mermaids: A Love Letter to the Ocean employs several professional mermaids from around the world to shed light on ocean acidification, overfishing, and marine pollution.

Safety concerns

Children
The practice of mermaiding, especially by young children, has also raised safety concerns about how wearing and swimming in a tail may actually make it harder for children to swim and/or easier to drown, especially when they are not highly experienced swimmers. In 2015, a YouTube video surfaced in which a mother had to come over and rescue her daughter, who was drowning in a backyard pool after trying to do a flip while wearing a mermaid tail. Even as the video, which had gone viral, made efforts to express that mermaid tails can still be fun to play in with proper safety and supervision, various swimming pools in several countries, including Australian YMCA pools, began banning the tails around that time and in the years to come.

The bans did not come without criticism. Some contended that it would be better to emphasize safety and supervision while using the tails, rather than banning them outright. A few others suggested that having mermaiders pass swim tests would also be a viable alternative to bans.

Professionals
Professional mermaids also encounter safety risks. In general, they must contend with having only a limited amount of oxygen to swim and stay underwater, as they traditionally eschew scuba equipment. Tank performers have found ways to overcome this issue, such as using air tubes installed in certain areas of the tank to receive a fresh burst of oxygen without having to resurface. Another way to cope with the limited oxygen involves stationing scuba divers in the tank where the mermaid performs and have them bring the mermaid fresh air whenever they request it with a gesture, although this method requires careful vigilance and attention. Failure to recognize the need for air can prove life-threatening for the performer, with at least one report of a mermaid nearly asphyxiating during a performance when divers missed her requests for air.

Mermaids also incur various health risks while immersed in water. Without swim caps, mermaids fully expose their ears to water, subjecting them to ear pain and infection. The water they swim in may also contain bacteria that subjects them to waterborne illnesses and infections. Other potential minor health issues that mermaids can experience include foot blisters that occur as their tightly packed feet rub against the insides of the tail costume, muscle cramps in the legs from strenuous swimming movements in the tail costume, red eyes caused by continual exposure to chlorine in swimming pool water, along with cold and flu-like symptoms and minor respiratory problems induced from being in cold water. Mermaids who wear latex tin-cure tails are also subject to several toxic health effects that the chemicals of such material impart (see above).

Mermaids who swim in the open ocean can have their safety jeopardized if they get too close to particular sea animals. For instance, a mermaid who gets up close to a whale would be at risk of being struck hard and seriously injured by even the slightest of the whale's movements. Although there are no reports of mermaids getting attacked or bitten by sharks, two mermaids have recounted colliding with one. A few others have recalled getting stung by venomous jellyfish.  Despite these dangers, Hannah Mermaid herself has experience being able to fearlessly swim around great white sharks in full costume without a heavy-duty cage by maintaining high situational awareness and caution, determined to not let them challenge her dream while also expressing high respect for these predators and demonstrating how they are not eager to hunt anything like her.

See also
Sip 'n Dip Lounge
Weeki Wachee, Florida
Mermaid
Synchronized swimming
Freediving

References

External links 

 Professional Mermaid Nina
 Professional Mermaid Linden
 Professional Real-Life Mermaid Melissa
 Professional Mermaid Tails

 Business Week article on professional mermaids
 Huffington Post Interview with a Professional Mermaid
 Oprah on Mission of Mermaids
 MerNetwork
 A guide for children on how to become a mermaid

Water sports
Cosplay
Mermaids in popular culture

de:Mermaiding